Reema Omer (born 3 June 1986) is a Pakistani lawyer and human rights professional from Lahore. She is working as a legal adviser for the International Commission of Jurists. She regularly writes her opinion on the legal landscape and human rights issues in Pakistan, and contributes her legal and political analysis in current affairs shows on different news channels.

Early life and education 
Omer, one of two children, was born and raised in Lahore, Pakistan. She was educated at Lahore Grammar School, where she completed her O' Level in 2002 and got a world distinction in A' Level law in 2004. She did her BA-LL.B from Lahore University of Management Sciences in 2009, where she was awarded a gold medal for the best student. Later, she did an LLM specializing in public international law in 2010 from the University of Cambridge, UK. Omer is married to Dr. Ali Jan and has a daughter, Roohi.

Career 
Since 2011, she has been serving as a consultant for South Asia and an international legal adviser for Pakistan to the International Commission of Jurists, an INGO, composed of 60 eminent judges and lawyers from all regions of the world, that engage in promotion and protection of human rights through the Rule of Law, by using its unique legal expertise to develop and strengthen national and international justice systems.

She is a member of the Human Rights Commission of Pakistan, an NGO that provides a highly informed and objective voice in the struggle for the provision of human rights for all and democratic development in Pakistan. She has been providing training to human rights activists on national and international human rights protection mechanisms. She has been giving talks on legal matters and human rights issues and moderating several panel discussions nationally and internationally.

She has been engaged in writing numerous articles and reports based on the assessment of Pakistan's compliance with international human rights obligations under human rights treaties. She has been organizing and participating in panel discussions on human rights issues in South Asia, and has been delivering oral statements at the United Nations human rights council, and in the interactive dialogue with UN special procedures.

She regularly participates as a legal and political analyst in current affairs shows on various news channels. She frequently contributes articles to several online and print newspapers on the themes relating to human rights such as; the rule of law, freedom of expression, social justice, access to justice, gender disparity in the legal sector, Pakistan's international commitments, and national human rights institutions, etc. Her contribution as opinion-writer to the Dawn newspaper, Geo TV, The News, and Daily Times serve to increase understanding about the legal lacunas in national laws, and provide ways forward to address the human rights issues that exist in Pakistan.

She is also very active on the social media platform Twitter with followers over 160K. She is vocal on raising voice against issues such as; enforced disappearances, misuse of blasphemy laws, gender-based violence, lack of fair trial, impunity, Freedom of media, and military courts.

Report Card 
Reema Omer regularly appears as an analyst along with leading analysts and opinion makers comprising Suhail Warraich, Mazhar Abbas, Hassan Nisar, Benazir Shah, Shahzad Iqbal, Muneeb Farooq, Ather Kazmi and Irshad Hameed, on the current affairs talk show of the Geo News called "Report Card" wherein she presents her opinion and analysis on legal matters and political situation in Pakistan.

Aurat Card 
Reema Omer along with female journalists including; Benazir Shah, Mehmal Sarfaraz and Natasha created a YouTube show called "Aurat Card", to give women a platform to voice out their concerns and share their perspective. They discuss the variety of topics and issues they have expertise and interest in particularly related to politics, law, sports or entertainment. They analyze current affairs, review movies and dramas, and review different products of use.

Intimidation and harassment 
In 2019, Twitter sent a notice to Reema Omer that her tweets questioning the procedures of military courts, were in violation of the Constitution of Pakistan. However, then Federal Minister for Information Fawad Chaudhry denied the government's involvement in submitting an official correspondence to Twitter against Reema's in tweets.

In 2020, Reema along with other female journalists appeared before the National Assembly's standing committee on human rights and requested its Chairman Bilawal Bhutto Zardari and the members to address the incidents of sexual harassment that female journalists and analysts have to face on Twitter. Having heard the accounts, the Federal Minister for Human Rights, Shireen Mazari condemned the harassment of female journalists and promised to take action against the persons involved in online harassment.

Publications 
Omer contributed to several publications especially briefing papers and reports on the implementation of human rights and access to justice in Pakistan.

Authority without accountability: The search for justice in Pakistan
 Briefing Paper on Violations of the Right to Freedom of Religion or Belief in Pakistan
 Briefing Paper on Transgender Persons (Protection of Rights) Act, 2018
 On Trial: The Implementation of Pakistan's Blasphemy Laws

Articles 

 Musharraf treason case: In absentia and due process
 Do Alleged "Terrorists" and Spies Have the Right to Consular Access Under the VCCR?
 Beyond "Winners" and "Losers": Understanding the International Court of Justice's Judgment in the Jadhav Case
 COMMENT: Political point-scoring over Jadhav case
 Its UPR time again
 The third review
 GSP-Plus & media freedom
 Crucial human rights review
 Dismal approach to rights
 Military 'justice'
 Defining judicial misconduct
 Defining hate speech
 Myths about rape
 Injustice by law – the case of Junaid Hafeez
 Asia bibi's case: A final plea for justice
 A review of Pakistan's commission on missing persons
 Criminalising 'disappearances'
 Reimagining Justice
 Judging the Judges
 Unfair trials

Awards and recognition 
She was awarded the Commonwealth Pegasus scholarship in 2010 where she worked in barristers' chambers in London on human rights cases.

References 

1986 births
Living people
Punjabi women
Pakistani human rights activists
Pakistani humanists
Pakistani feminists
Feminism in Pakistan
Women's rights in Pakistan
Pakistani women's rights activists
Pakistani civil rights activists
Pakistani women lawyers
Lawyers from Lahore
Pakistani journalists
Lahore University of Management Sciences alumni
Alumni of the University of Cambridge
Lahore Grammar School alumni